Kasavand (also Romanized as Kasāvand and Kesāvand) is a village in Kamazan-e Olya Rural District, Zand District, Malayer County, Hamadan Province, Iran. At the 2006 census, its population was 448, in 114 families.

References 

Populated places in Malayer County